Andris José Hernández Gimenez (born January 11, 1982) is a male professional track and road racing cyclist from Venezuela. He won three medals for his native country at the 2007 Pan American Games in Rio de Janeiro, Brazil.

Career

2002
 2nd Team pursuit, Central American and Caribbean Games
2006
 1st Pan American Points Race Championships
 Central American and Caribbean Games
2nd Team pursuit
2nd Points race
 2nd National Time Trial Championships
 3rd Overall Vuelta al Oriente
2007
 Pan American Games
1st Points race
2nd Team sprint
3rd Madison
 2nd Pan American Points Race Championships
 9th Overall Vuelta a Venezuela
2008
 1st Stage 4 Clásico Virgen de la Consolación de Táriba
 2nd Clásico Gobernación de Anzoátegui
 3rd Overall Clásico Ciclístico Batalla de Carabobo
2009
 1st Stage 6 Tour de Guadeloupe
 3rd Overall Vuelta Ciclista Aragua
2014
 Vuelta a Venezuela
1st  Mountains classification
1st Stage 2
2016
 5th Overall Vuelta a Venezuela

References
 

1982 births
Living people
Venezuelan male cyclists
Venezuelan track cyclists
Tour de Guadeloupe stage winners
Cyclists at the 2007 Pan American Games
People from Barinas (state)
Pan American Games gold medalists for Venezuela
Pan American Games silver medalists for Venezuela
Pan American Games bronze medalists for Venezuela
Pan American Games medalists in cycling
Central American and Caribbean Games silver medalists for Venezuela
Competitors at the 2002 Central American and Caribbean Games
Competitors at the 2006 Central American and Caribbean Games
Central American and Caribbean Games medalists in cycling
Medalists at the 2007 Pan American Games
21st-century Venezuelan people